Gallaunmore is a standing stone and National Monument located in County Kerry, Ireland.

The northwest and southeast sides taper towards the tip.

References

National Monuments in County Kerry
Archaeological sites in County Kerry